Vlastimil Karal (born 26 April 1983) is a Czech football defender currently playing for Bohemians Prague in the Czech 2. Liga.

Career statistics

Statistics accurate as of 30 June 2013

References

External links
 

1983 births
Living people
Czech footballers
Czech First League players
Bohemians 1905 players
FC Hradec Králové players
FK Čáslav players
FK Bohemians Prague (Střížkov) players
Association football defenders